Tarek Alarian (born September 12, 1963) is a Palestinian-Egyptian film director.  He is also credited as Tarek El'eryan and Tarek Eryan.

Education 
Alarian holds a Bachelor of Arts degree in both Communication and also Cinema and Photography from Southern Illinois University.

Professional experience 
 August 1986-May 1988: Executive Producer AAA (Film Production and Studios) Athens, Greece.
 1987- Ongoing: Director, Producer, Screenwriter Freelance.
 July 1988-March 1993: Executive Producer Raid Alarian Film Production (Feature Film Production Distribution).
 March 1993-April 2005: Founder and CEO Online (Film, Music Video Production and Advertising Agency).
 June 1999 – 2001: Founder and CEO Framework (Feature Film Production).
 February 2003: Founder and CEO Fame Music (Music Label and Talent Management Company).
 August 2005-Ongoing: Founder and CEO Stargate (Music Label and Talent Management Company).
 November 2005-Ongoing: Partner and CEO CPH, Creative Production House(Music Videos, TV Commercials, TV Series, TV Programs, Feature Films production, and Equipment rental).

Career

Film 
 The Emperor (El Imbarator) 1989 (Director and Producer).
 Le Pasha (El Basha) 1992 (Director, Producer, and Story).
 Snakes and Ladders (El Selim Wi El Taaban) 2001 (Director, Producer, Co-Screenwriter, and Story).
 Tito 2004 (Director, Producer, and Story).
 A Girl Left Behind (Director)
 Aswar EL Qmar (Director)
 New Life (Director, Screenwriter)

TV commercials (director) 
Directed around 350 TV commercials including:
 Coca-Cola Campaign.
 Sprite.
 Tourism Promotion (Egypt).
 Tourism Promotion (Dubai).
 Americana food Campaign.
 Channel Launch Campaign (Zoom).
 Hyundai Campaign.
 Pocari Drink Campaign.
 Dwarf Feta cheese
 Hlawany Jam
 Coca-Cola lyrics (Hisham Abbas)
 P&J Tomato paste
 Menatel (Hamada)
 Beverly Hills
 Goldy washing machine
 LG Fridge
 P&J juice
 Coca-Cola  (Hisham Abbas)  habetha
 Coca-Cola  (Amer Mounib)  concert
 Coca-Cola  (Amer Mounib)
 Fine Kleenex
 Ciao Make up
 Good Morning soap
 Sprite
 Coca-Cola  ne3eesh stadium
 Coca-Cola El Khateeb

Awards 
Over 15 local and international awards including:
 Cairo film festival for the achievement of the year 1990 (The Emperor).

References

External links 

Egyptian film directors
Egyptian people of Palestinian descent
1963 births
Living people